Lateri is a town and a nagar panchayat in Vidisha district in the Indian state of Madhya Pradesh.

Demographics

As of the 2011 Census of India, Lateri had a population of 30,000. Males constitute 53% of the population and females 47%. Lateri has an average literacy rate of 50%, lower than the national average of 59.5%: male literacy is 59%, and female literacy is 39%. In Lateri, 18% of the population is under 6 years of age.

Politics
Laxmikant Sharma was chosen four times consecutively as BJP M.L.A. from Sironj-Lateri constituency but he lost to Gowardhan Upadhyay an INC candidate in assembly elections of 2013.

References

Cities and towns in Vidisha district